George Best DL, JP (10 November 1759 – 8 September 1818) was a British politician.

Best was the son of James Best, of Park House, Boxley, Kent, High Sheriff of Kent in 1751, by Frances, daughter of Richard Shelley, of  Michaelgrove, Sussex. He sat as Member of Parliament for Rochester from 1790 to 1796. He was also a Deputy Lieutenant and Justice of the Peace for Kent.

Best married Caroline, daughter of Edward Scott, of Scott's Hall, Kent, in 1784. They had several children, including Dorothy Best, wife of Reverend Joseph George Brett and mother of William Brett, 1st Viscount Esher. The family lived at Chilston Park, Boughton Malherbe, Kent. Best died in September 1818, aged 58.

References

1759 births
1818 deaths
British MPs 1790–1796
Members of the Parliament of Great Britain for English constituencies
Deputy Lieutenants of Kent
People from Boughton Malherbe